"Home on the Range" is the state song of Kansas, U.S.

Home on the Range may also refer to:

 Home on the Range (1935 film), a drama directed by Arthur Jacobson
 Home on the Range (1940 film), an animation film by MGM
 Home on the Range (1946 film), a drama directed by Robert Springsteen
 Home on the Range (2004 film), a Disney animated feature film
 A Home on the Range, a 2002 American documentary about Jewish chicken ranchers
Home on the Range (1982 film) on the 1975 Australian constitutional crisis
 Home on the Range (album)